State Route 140 (SR 140) was a state highway located in Clark and Skamania counties in southwestern Washington. The roadway first appeared as Canyon Creek Road in a 1911 map and was designated Secondary State Highway 8B (SSH 8B) in 1937. SR 120 replaced SSH 8B in the same renumbering and SR 12 was renumbered in 1967 to SR 14 after  was extended into Washington. SR 120 was also renumbered to SR 140, which was decommissioned in 1992.

Route description

The highway crossed the Washougal River out of Washougal in a large forest and became the Washougal River Road. The roadway paralleled the river northeast and later east into the forests and mountains of Skamania County until the river turned north. SR 140, renamed Canyon Creek Road, turned southeast and encountered a series of sharp turns until terminating at SR 14 in Prindle.

History

SR 140 began as Canyon Creek Road and first appeared on a map in 1911. The first numbered highway on the road was Secondary State Highway 8B (SSH 8B), established in 1937. SSH 8B remained unchanged until the 1964 highway renumbering, when the route was renumbered as State Route 120 and PSH 8 became . After  was extended west across Washington in 1967, SR 12 became SR 14 and SR 120 became SR 140. In 1968, US 830 was deleted and SR 14 was realigned south onto a newer alignment. In 1992, SR 140 was removed from the state highway system.

Major intersections

References

External links

Highways of Washington State: SR 140
Highways of Washington State: SR 120

140
Transportation in Clark County, Washington
Transportation in Skamania County, Washington